Plaktiniai (formerly) is a village in Kėdainiai district municipality, in Kaunas County, in central Lithuania. According to the 2011 census, the village had a population of 8 people. The Šušvė Landscape Sanctuary is located next to Plaktiniai.

History
The village has been known since 1595.

Demography

Images

References

Villages in Kaunas County
Kėdainiai District Municipality